James Overstreet (February 11, 1773May 24, 1822) was a U.S. Representative from South Carolina.

Born near Barnwell Court House in the Barnwell District of the Province of South Carolina, Overstreet attended the common schools.
He studied law.
He was admitted to the bar in 1798 and commenced practice in Barnwell District.
He served as member of the state house of representatives from 1808 to 1813.

Overstreet was elected as a Democratic-Republican to the Sixteenth and Seventeenth Congresses and served from March 4, 1819, until his death May 24, 1822, at China Grove, North Carolina, while en route to his home from Washington, D.C.
He was interred in Savitz Cemetery at Mount Zion Reformed Church, China Grove, North Carolina.

See also
List of United States Congress members who died in office (1790–1899)

Sources

External links
 

1773 births
1822 deaths
Democratic-Republican Party members of the United States House of Representatives from South Carolina
People from Barnwell County, South Carolina